Sheldrake Lake is a lake in the Canadian province of Nova Scotia. It drains to Five Island Lake. It stretches  in the north-south direction, and  kilometres in the east-west direction.

Otherwise, there are the following at Sheldrake Lake:
 Upper Sheldrake Lake
 Big Hubley Lake

Sheldrake Lake is surrounded primarily by forests. Around Sheldrake Lake, it is quite densely populated, with 108 inhabitants per square kilometre. The tract is part of the hemiboreal climate zone.  The annual average temperature in the funnel is 6 °C. The warmest month is July, when the average temperature is 18 °C, and the coldest is January, with -8 °C. Average yearly average is 1 826 millimetres. The rainy month is December, with an average of 299 mm rainfall, and the driest is May, with 84 mm rainfall.

References

Lakes of Nova Scotia